() is a municipality and village in Frýdek-Místek District in the Moravian-Silesian Region of the Czech Republic. It has about 1,000 inhabitants.

Polish minority makes up 14.4% of the population.

Etymology
The origins of the name are dubious. If the original name of the village was Trzeciesz it could have been patronymic in origin derived from personal name Trzeciech. Czech scribing can be related to common local names Střítež denoting damp places vegetated by deergrass. According to A. Bańkowski the name is derived from Old Polish czrzecież, equivalent to Old Czech form denoting rather "hack and slash" than reed (Polish: trzcina).

Geography
Střítež lies in the historical region of Cieszyn Silesia, in the Moravian-Silesian Foothills. The Ropičanka stream flows through the municipality.

History

The creation of the village was a part of a larger settlement campaign taking place in the late 13th century on the territory of what will be later known as Upper Silesia. The first written mention of Střítež is in a Latin document of Diocese of Wrocław called Liber fundationis episcopatus Vratislaviensis from around 1305 as Trezhes.

Politically the village belonged initially to the Duchy of Teschen, ruled by a local branch of Piast dynasty. In 1327 the duchy became a fee of Kingdom of Bohemia, which after 1526 became part of the Habsburg monarchy.

Střítež became a seat of a Catholic parish, mentioned in the register of Peter's Pence payment from 1447 among 50 parishes of Teschen deanery as Stzreczicz. After the 1540s Protestant Reformation prevailed in the Duchy of Teschen and a local Catholic church was taken over by Lutherans. It was taken from them (as one from around fifty buildings in the region) by a special commission and given back to the Roman Catholic Church on 23 March 1654.

After Revolutions of 1848 in the Austrian Empire a modern municipal division was introduced in the re-established Austrian Silesia. The village as a municipality was subscribed to the political and legal district of Cieszyn. According to the censuses conducted in 1880–1910 the population of the municipality grew from 582 in 1880 to 614 in 1910 with a majority being native Polish-speakers (between 92.9% and 96.6%) accompanied by a German-speaking minority (at most 39 or 6.6% in 1900) and Czech-speaking (at most 7 or 1.2% in 1890). In terms of religion in 1910 the majority were Roman Catholics (54.7%), followed by Protestants (43.5%) and Jews (11 or 1.8%).

After World War I, Polish–Czechoslovak War and the division of Cieszyn Silesia in 1920, the municipality became a part of Czechoslovakia. Following the Munich Agreement, in October 1938 together with the Zaolzie region it was annexed by Poland, administratively adjoined to Cieszyn County of Silesian Voivodeship. It was then annexed by Nazi Germany at the beginning of World War II. After the war it was restored to Czechoslovakia.

Sights
The parish Church of Saint Michael the Archangel was built in 1806. It replaced an old wooden church destroyed by a fire.

References

External links

 

Villages in Frýdek-Místek District
Cieszyn Silesia